Chittagong Abahani Limited, also spelled as Chattogram Abahani or Chittagong Abahoni, is a sports club based in Chittagong, Bangladesh. A wing of Abahani Limited was established at Chittagong in 1980 known as Chittagong Abahani. Though it was established as a wing of Abahani Limited, Chittagong Abahani has its own directorial board,  club structure and operates separately at present. It is considered as the most successful football club from Chittagong. It is currently a team of the Bangladesh Premier League (BPL), the top tier of Bangladeshi football.

The team was relegated from Bangladesh Premier League in 2010–11 season. It again gained the promotion to Premier League by becoming champion of the 2013 Bangladesh Championship League. The club host Sheikh Kamal International Club Cup, a bi-annual tournament in memory of their founder, Sheikh Kamal. They won the inaugural edition of the tournament in 2015. The club won their first major domestic trophy in 2016 by winning the 2016 Independence Cup under the guidance of Slovak coach Jozef Pavlik. Chittagong Abahani had a fierce rivalry with Chittagong Mohammedan earlier in Chittagong Premier League and later in Bangladesh Premier League.

History

1980–2000: Beginning
In late 1970s, Didarul Alam Chowdhury was inspired by the Dhaka-based club Abahani Limited Dhaka. He is a football organizer from Chittagong. Didarul wanted to establish a wing of Abahani in Chittagong for the betterment of Sports in Chittagong. He convened a meeting with other local organizers on 10 October 1980. With the meeting, Chittagong Abahani officially started its journey.

Iqbal Khan, popular footballer of Chittagong and father of Tamim Iqbal & Nafees Iqbal, played a vital role Chittagong Abahani's inception. He also played for Chittagong Abahani. Chittagong Abahani won their first-ever Chittagong League title under his captaincy.

2000–2014: Journey at top level
Chittagong Abahani qualified for the 2000-01 National Football Championship after being crowned the 1999 Chittagong League title. The team finished 3rd in the NFC season. In 2001-02 National Football Championship, Ctg Abahani finished at Super Four. Chittagong Abahani also became runners-up twice of Chittagong League in 2000s decade.

In 2007, Bangladesh Football Federation started B. League (now Bangladesh Premier League), country's first professional football league. Chittagong Abahani was one of the founding teams of the league. After struggling in the first three seasons, Ctg Abahani relegated to Bangladesh Championship League in 2010–11 season.

The port city outfit finished at the bottom in their first BCL season. However, there was no relegation system for second tier in that time which saved the team from demotion. The Blue Pirates made a strong comeback in next season becoming Champion of 2013-14 BCL & came back to top tier. Chittagong Abahani finished at 9th in 2014-15 BPL, their returning season to top tier.

2015–present: Beginning of the revolutionary era
In November 2014, Tarafder Ruhul Amin of Saif Powertec Limited became chairman of Chittagong Abahani Directorial Board. Saif Powertec Limited becomes new sponsor of Chittagong Abahani.

In 2015, Chittagong Abahani organised inaugural edition of Sheikh Kamal International Club Cup at M. A. Aziz Stadium, Chittagong before the 2015-16 domestic season. It was the first international club tournament at Chittagong since 1982. Chittagong Abahani won the tournament beating Kolkata giant East Bengal in final. The huge attendance of the final broke all the recent records. The port city outfit gave their arrival message as a rising giant with this tournament.

In May 2016, Chittagong Abahani won 2016 Independence Cup under their first ever foreign coach Jozef Pavlik. It was the first domestic major trophy of the club history. Chittagong Abahani finished at 2nd in 2016 BPL, their best result ever. They signed Bangladesh national team Captain Mamunul Islam, Bhutan international Chencho Gyeltshen, former Haiti international Fabrice Noel & Leonel Saint Preux for this season.

Chittagong Abahani also become runners-up of 2017 Independence Cup, 2017 Federation Cup & finished 3rd in 2017-18 BPL. However, the Blue Pirates performed down in 2018–19 season as they knocked out from both tournaments in quarterfinal & obtained 8th position in the league.

Maruful Haque era

Current squad
Chittagong Abahani Ltd. squad for 2022–23 season.

Personnel

Current technical staff
As of 12 February 2023

Coaches
  Asaduzzaman Jhontu (2015)
  Shafiqul Islam Manik (10 August 2015 – 15 March 2016)
  Jozef Pavlík (30 March 2016 – 21 September 2016)
  Zulfiker Mahmud Mintu (22 September 2016 – 31 December 2016)
  Saiful Bari Titu (9 January 2017 – 4 January 2018)
  Zulfiker Mahmud Mintu (4 January 2018 – 3 August 2019)
  Maruful Haque (October 2019 – 28 August 2022)
  Saiful Bari Titu (9 November 2022  – 12 February 2023)
  Mahbubul Haque (12 February 2023 – present)

Management

Board of Directors

As of January 2020.

Team records

Head coach record

Top scorers by season

All-time top scorers
The table is a record of goals scored since 2017–18 season and accurate as of the end of the 2021–22 season. Goals scored in major competitions (Premier League, Federation Cup & Independence Cup) are counted in the above list.

Source: Soccerway

All-time top scorers in Premier League
The table is a record of goals scored since 2017–18 season and accurate as of the end of the 2021–22 season.

Source: Soccerway

Most appearances in Premier League
The table is a record of appearances made since 2017–18 season and accurate as of the end of the 2021–22 season.

Source: Soccerway

Recent seasons

Source: RSSF

Stadium

The M. A. Aziz Stadium with 25,000-plus capacity is the primary home venue of Chittagong Abahani. They play their home matches of BPL in this stadium. They also organise the Sheikh Kamal International Club Cup, a biannual international football tournament, at this stadium.

However, the club currently playing their home matches at Shaheed Dhirendranath Datta Stadium of Cumilla. The club also used Bangabandhu National Stadium as home venue in some seasons due to COVID-19 pandemic in Bangladesh and other reasons.

Kit manufacturers and shirt sponsors

Honours

League
  Bangladesh Premier League
 Runners-up (1): 2016
 Bangladesh Championship League
 Champions (1): 2013
  Chittagong Premier League 
 Champions (1): 1998–99
 Runners-up (2): 2003–04, 2005–06

Cup
 Independence Cup
 Winners (1): 2016
 Runners-up (1): 2017
 Federation Cup
 Runners-up (1): 2017

Invitational
 Sheikh Kamal International Club Cup
 Winners (1): 2015
 Runners-up (1): 2019

Notable overseas players
Players listed below have had senior international cap(s) for their respective countries before, while and/or after playing at Chittagong Abahani. The years indicate the time they played for the club.

Asia
  Omid Popalzay (2021–2022)
  Chencho Gyeltshen (2016–2017)
  Daniel Tagoe (2018–2019)
  Santosh Sahukhala (2007–2010)
  Lok Bandhu Gurung (2008–2013)
  Kiran Chemjong (2008–2010)
Africa
  William Twala (2021–2022)
North America
  Leonel Saint-Preux (2016–2018)
  Fabrice Noël (2016)

See also
2022–23 Chittagong Abahani season

References

External links
 Abahani Chittagong at the BFF

Association football clubs established in 1980
Football clubs in Bangladesh
Sport in Chittagong
1980 establishments in Bangladesh